Vinaccia is a surname. Notable people with the surname include:

Giovan Domenico Vinaccia (1625–1695), Italian architect, goldsmith, engineer, and sculptor
Pasquale Vinaccia (1806–1882) Italian luthier and instrument-maker 
Paolo Vinaccia (1954–2019), Italian musician

Italian-language surnames